Gregg Landaker (born 1951) is a retired American re-recording mixer. He won four Academy Awards for Best Sound and has been nominated for five more in the same category. He worked on 207 films from 1979 until his retirement in 2017, when he decided that the film Dunkirk would be the final film he would work on.

Selected filmography
Landaker has won four Academy Awards for Best Sound and has been nominated for five more in the same category.

Won
 The Empire Strikes Back (1980)
 Raiders of the Lost Ark (1981)
 Speed (1994)
 Dunkirk (2017)

Nominated
 JFK (1991)
 Waterworld (1995)
 Twister (1996)
 U-571 (2000)
 Interstellar (2014)

References

External links
 
 https://web.archive.org/web/20160424180920/http://www.wbsound.com/portfolio/gregg-landaker/ WB sound portfolio

1951 births
Living people
American audio engineers
Best Sound Mixing Academy Award winners
Best Sound BAFTA Award winners